Pərioğlular (also, Pərioğullar, Parioglylar, and Perioglular) is a village and municipality in the Aghjabadi Rayon of Azerbaijan.  It has a population of 1,476.

References 

Populated places in Aghjabadi District